Marry Me Now is a 2018 South Korean television series starring Han Ji-hye and Lee Sang-woo. The series aired on KBS2 from March 17 to September 9, 2018.

Synopsis

The drama centers around a balanced, multigenerational family.

Park Hyo-seob, is a widower and a compassionate father to his four children; Park Sun-ha, Park Yoo-Ha, Park Jae-hyung and Park Hyun-ha. His life takes a turn when he meets his first love, Lee Mi-yeon after 36 years.

After their mother's untimely death, Park Sun-ha takes the responsibility of her younger siblings. She acts as a mother to the family.

In the other hand, the second daughter, Park Yoo-ha studied hard in medical school and finished her intern course but sacrifices her dream to become a doctor in order to marry her love, who is from a rich family. They have a daughter, Eun-su. However, her life isn't as perfect as people think it to be.

Meanwhile, Jung Eun-tae is an enthusiastic doctor. He volunteered for performing medical service abroad in Africa, but he comes back to Korea. Eun-tae is not interested in marriage because he believes he is like his father, who placed priority on his medical work over family.

Later, Park Yoo-ha and Jung Eun-tae's lives become intertwined.

Cast

Main 
Han Ji-hye as Park Yoo-ha
She is Hyo-seob’s second daughter. She is a rational woman with a passionate heart. Whereas the eldest daughter Sun-ha looked after the siblings like a mother, Yoo-ha was the type who would give her younger siblings a lesson. The fact that she got into medical school made her the pride and joy of the family. When she married Seongun, a millionaire's son, she was called a Cinderella and became the envy of many women. Although Seongun made her forgo her dream of becoming a doctor, she still loved him. As time went by, she found herself gradually becoming a woman befitting a member of Seongun's family. As she did for Seongun, she starts to endure everything for her lovely daughter Eun-su.
Lee Sang-woo as Jung Eun-tae
Choi Seung-hoon as young Jung Eun-tae
He's an internist at Jahan Hospital. He is a cranky doctor who takes the lead in going on voluntary medical service abroad. He may be a rogue, but he's the finest doctor. People call him an arrogant, rude and unruly "mad dog," but he doesn't mind it at all because thanks to this nickname, no other doctor would try to irritate him. Surprisingly, he is the most caring brother and uncle to his older sister and his niece, and he's as generous as a saint to his patients. His late father was in the forefront of overseas medical services. Back then, he resented his father for being neglectful of his family while he was busy taking care of his patients. But when he followed his father's footsteps and served in Africa, at last he came to understand his father. But as a side effect, he decided not to marry. Dating is fine, but forget marriage. He doesn't want to hurt his family like his father did. He would commit to practicing medicine for his entire life. After serving in Africa for several years, he returns to Korea when his brother-in-law, who is the director of Jahan Hospital, calls for help. Eventually, he will start dating Yoo-ha.
Yoo Dong-geun as Park Hyo-seob
Yoo In-hyuk as young Park Hyo-seob
He is a master shoemaker and owner of a handmade shoe store. At the same time, he is a compassionate father of four children. This man of perseverance has been making handmade shoes for several decades at the same spot. Ever since his wife died, he has been sacrificing his life for his children, who mean the world to him along with shoes. However, wind suddenly starts blowing in his peaceful life. He had wished that his eldest daughter would marry a reliable man, but she brings a younger boyfriend as a potential spouse. His town, where he has lived his entire life, is targeted for redevelopment. On top of all, his first love, Miyeon, shows up after 36 years, just like a storm. And she's no ordinary woman. She's a proud building owner.
Chang Mi-hee as Lee Mi-yeon
Jung Chae-yeon as young Lee Mi-yeon
She is a woman of overbearing haughtiness. But she's also a majestic and elegant landlord. She is arrogant, but she behaves with common decency. She is rude, but she keeps it within bounds. She makes poignant remarks, but she only says the right things. That's why even her audacity and evil tongue seem to make her more charming. Every single investment she makes hits the jackpot, and everything prospers with her. Nevertheless, her life was not without a few bumps on the road. After her husband ran off overseas when his company went bankrupt, she started from the bottom and kept on rolling until she came to own a building. Although she is enjoying a glamorous single life, she feels empty inside somehow. In the beginning, she lives with her “son” Moon-sik. To recollect the happiest time of her life, she decides to restore the house in which she lived with her father in her twenties. Then she comes across Hyoseob, her first love and object of her hatred.
Park Sun-young as Park Sun-ha
Hyo-seob’s first daughter. She became the mother of the family after her mother died.
Yeo Hoe-hyun as Park Jae-hyung
Hyo-seob’s only son. He’s trying to find a job.
Keum Sae-rok as Park Hyun-ha
Hyo-seob’s last born child.

Supporting
Park Chul-ho as Ma Dong-ho
Kim Ye-ryeong as Shim Il-soon
Choi Jung-woo as Yeon Chan-koo
Kim Mi-kyung as Jung Jin-hee
Park Se-wan as Yeon Da-yeon
Kim Kwon as Choi Moon-sik
Park Joon-geum as Woo A-mi
Kang Sung-wook as Cha Kyung-su
Hwang Dong-joo as Chae Sung-woon
Kim Yoon-kyung as Chae Hee-kyung
Park Sang-myun as CEO Yang
Choi Dae-chul as Team Leader Go
Lee Ji-hoon as Manager Yoo
Hong Seung-hwi as Assistant Manager Kim
Lee Kan-hee as Kang Young-jin
Kim Woo-hyuk as Ji Woong-hee
Kang Yu-chan as VIP customer (Cameo)
Ji Yoon-ho as Han Tae-soo
Kim Yu-seok as Choi Dong-jin
 Lee Han-wi as Kim Young-sik (cameo)

Production
The first script read was held in December 2017 at KBS Annex Building.

Controversy
The "Hope Solidarity Union" (희망연대노조) recently expressed concern about the well—being of the drama's working staff. According to the union, the production staff members were exposed to a harsh working environment — they were overworked but their salary was too low. The HSU is currently mediating a dialogue between the staff, KBS, and GnG Production.

Original soundtrack

Viewership

Awards and nominations

Notes

References

External links
  
 

Korean Broadcasting System television dramas
2018 South Korean television series debuts
2018 South Korean television series endings
Korean-language television shows